The Lola T120, also known as the BMW G767, was a Group 7 sports prototype race car, designed, developed and built by British manufacturer Lola, specifically to compete in hill climb racing, in 1967. It was powered by a unique 2-liter, 16-valve, four-cylinder engine, designed by Ludwig Apfelbeck, to produce between 260 and 280 hp @ 8500 rpm, and was itself based on the M10 engine.

References

Sports prototypes
T120